Manuel Panselinos was a Byzantine (Roman) fresco and icon painter in the late Byzantine Empire. He was active in the region of Macedonia, and is the most prominent figure of the Palaiologan Renaissance and the Macedonian School of painting, centred at the Empire's second city, Thessaloniki.

History 
Manuel Panselinos was born in the late 13th century in Thessaloniki. His primary works were iconography and frescos.  His works can be found in several monasteries of Mount Athos: Vatopedi, Megisti Lavra, and the Protaton Church in Karyes.  His most important work is the mural painting of the church of the Protaton.  His contemporaries were Georgios Kalliergis, Michael Astrapas, and Eutychios Astrapas.  Some historians believe Kalliergis was one of his students due to the similarity in painting styles. 

However, the tradition ascribing the Athonite paintings to Panselinos dates only from the 17th century, and it is only in the 18th century that Dionysios of Fourna claimed that he was born in Thessaloniki, and to have derived some of the rules in his own work from him. Panselinos has sometimes been tentatively equated with Michael Astrapas or another member of the same family, but without firm evidence.

Gallery

See also
Ioannis Pagomenos
Theodore Apsevdis

References

Byzantine painters
Christian iconography
Year of birth unknown
Byzantine Thessalonians
13th-century births
14th-century deaths
Christianity in medieval Macedonia
13th-century Byzantine people
14th-century Byzantine people
14th-century Greek painters